Familie Bergmann is a West German television series.

See also
List of German television series

External links
 

1960s German television series
1969 German television series debuts
1971 German television series endings
German-language television shows
Das Erste original programming